Burnley railway station is the junction for the Lilydale, Belgrave, Alamein and Glen Waverley lines in Victoria, Australia. It serves the inner eastern Melbourne suburb of Burnley, and it opened on 1 May 1880 as Burnley Street. It was renamed Burnley on 1 September 1882.

Train stabling facilities are located at the eastern (Down) end of the station, adjacent to the Glen Waverley line, while an additional, rarely-used siding is located at the western (Up) end.

History

Opening on 1 May 1880, Burnley station, like the suburb itself, was named after William Burnley, a local land purchaser and a member of the Victorian Legislative Council for the district of North Bourke, between 1853-1856.

In August 1943, as part of the Ashworth Improvement Plan, a flyover was constructed to the east of the station, to allow Glen Waverley line services to cross over the Hawthorn-bound line.

In 1963, the Madden Grove level crossing, located nearby in the Down direction on the Glen Waverley line, was provided, replacing an earlier level crossing. In 1966, the signal box was rebuilt, the Burnley Street level crossing was grade-separated and the line towards Richmond expanded to quadruple track. In 1972, the third track to Hawthorn was commissioned. In 1997, the stabling facilities were provided, as part of the closure and replacement of Jolimont Yard.

On 19 December 2008, Burnley was upgraded to a Premium Station. On 30 November 2017, the signal box was abolished, with control transferred to Metrol.

Facilities, platforms and services

Burnley has two island platforms. The southern island platform (Platforms 1 and 2) includes a large building, which includes a customer service window, an enclosed waiting room and toilets. On weekdays, the majority of services to Lilydale and Belgrave don't stop at Burnley as these run express to other stations. Most services from Burnley usually only run as far as Blackburn or Ringwood.

It is serviced by Metro Trains' Lilydale, Belgrave, Alamein and Glen Waverley line services.

Platforms 1 and 2:
  all stations and limited express services to Flinders Street
  all stations and limited express services to Flinders Street
  weekday all stations and limited express services to Flinders Street
  all stations and limited express services to Flinders Street

Platform 3:
  off-peak and weekend all stations services to Lilydale; all stations services to Blackburn
  off-peak and weekend all stations services to Belgrave; all stations services to Blackburn 
  weekday peak all stations services to Glen Waverley

Platform 4: 
  weekday all stations services to Alamein
  all station services to Blackburn
  all station services to Blackburn
  off peak all station services to Glen Waverley.

Transport links

Yarra Trams operates one route via Burnley station:
 : Docklands (Waterfront City) – Wattle Park

References

External links

 Melway map at street-directory.com.au

Premium Melbourne railway stations
Railway stations in Australia opened in 1880
Railway stations in Melbourne
Railway stations in the City of Yarra